Maheta Matteo Molango (born 24 July 1982) is a Swiss-born sports executive and former professional footballer. He was born in Saint-Imier, Switzerland, he is an Italian citizen, born to a Congolese father and Italian mother.  As a player, his last team was Unión Adarve in group one of the Preferente de Madrid. He became the Chief Executive of the Professional Footballers' Association for England and Wales on 1 June 2021, replacing Gordon Taylor.

Career 
Molango began his professional career at Atletico Madrid when he was aged 18, following a successful trial with the club he signed a two-year professional contract.  Molango signed a three-year contract with Brighton & Hove Albion, after impressing then-manager Mark McGhee during a two-week trial for the club in the summer of 2004, shortly after being released by SV Wacker Burghausen in Germany. His career at Brighton got off to quick start, scoring a goal just 12 seconds into his debut versus Reading at Madejski Stadium. Despite his early goal, Brighton fell 3–2. Shortly after, Molango had a falling out with McGhee and after six total appearances, would not make another appearance in the 2004–05 season.

In the summer of 2005, Brighton allowed Molango to pursue a move elsewhere. After a successful trial with Lincoln City, Keith Alexander signed Molango on 3 August on a season-long loan. He scored his first and only goal for Lincoln in a 5-1 League Cup victory over Crewe Alexandra on 23 August 2005. In December 2005, while still at Lincoln City, Brighton informed Molango that he did not have a future with the Seagulls. After being sent back to Brighton by Keith Alexander, he again went on loan, this time to UB Conquense for the remainder of the 2005–06 season. He debuted for the club in their 1-1 Segunda División B home draw with UD Almansa on 29 January 2006 and went on to make eight league appearances for the club without finding the net.

At the start of the 2006–07 season, Molango went on loan to League One side Oldham Athletic on a month's loan. On 12 August 2006, he scored his only goal for the Latics in a 1–0 win over Swansea City. After six appearances and one goal for the club, Oldham decided not to renew his loan.

After returning to Brighton, Molango was given another chance under manager Dean Wilkins after Jake Robinson fell to an illness. However, Brighton lost to Carlisle United 3–1. Molango failed to impress Wilkins in the loss, who loaned him out to Wrexham the following week on a one-month loan. At Wrexham, Molango earned four starts including one in the FA Cup. However, his loan again was unrenewed, effectively sending him back to Brighton. After failing to make any more first-team appearances, Brighton and Molango agreed to part ways several months before his three-year contract was set to expire.

The day after ending his career with Brighton, Molango signed with Conference National side Grays Athletic until the end of the 2006–07 season. However, after just two league appearances for the Essex club, he was released after just a month.

Molango represented Congo Under-21s, making six appearances for the team.

Legal career
Following his release from Grays Athletic, he returned to Spain, trialling with Albacete Balompié in March 2007, UD Las Palmas in July 2007 and Lucena CF in August 2007.

Having obtained a LL.B and B.A. Political Science from Charles III University of Madrid, he joined the employment law department of the Madrid office of Baker & McKenzie in April 2007.  Molango is a specialist in employment and sports law and was part of the Baker McKenzie Advisory Board. In January 2008 he moved to the United States to study for the LL.M program in International Legal Studies at the American University Washington College of Law graduating in 2009 whilst also being the recipient of the college's Rubin Scholarship. Returning to Madrid and Baker & McKenzie, he played part-time football in the 2009–10 season for FC Villanueva del Pardillo
in group one of the Preferente before moving on to join their divisional counterparts Unión Adarve for the 2010–2011 season. He passed the New York bar examination in 2011.

Molango was seconded to Atlético Madrid in 2015, where he served as legal counsel. In his time at Atlético Madrid he focused on contract and transfer negations and within two transfer windows helped oversee 30 deals, including the sale of Mario Mandžukić to Juventus, Filipe Luís’ return from Chelsea, Yannick Carrasco’s switch from Monaco and Antoine Griezmann’s new deal.

Fluent in English, Spanish, French, Italian and German, Maheta was twice named one of the best sports lawyers in Spain by international rankings company Chambers and Partners.

RCD Mallorca 
He was appointed the Chief Executive of RCD Mallorca in 2016 following the takeover by former NBA star Steve Nash and Phoenix Suns owner Robert Sarver. His four years at RCD Mallorca saw the club achieve back-to-back promotions from Segunda División B to La Liga.

FIFA 
Molango was appointed Director of FIFA’s Diploma in Club management programme, which commenced in March 2021. In the role, he helps train executives, with speakers ranging from Arsène Wenger to Fabio Cannavaro.

Professional Footballers' Association 
From 1 June 2021, Molango was appointed as the Chief Executive of the Professional Footballers' Association (PFA) for England and Wales.

In September 2021, Molango pledged to donate his brain as part of a concussion initiative which will research Chronic Traumatic Encephalopathy and other consequences of brain trauma in athletes.

It was announced in October 2021 that Molango and the PFA were calling on football stakeholders to establish an industry-wide care fund to support players living with dementia and other neurodegenerative conditions.

The PFA outlined details of reforms to contracts in the women’s game in February 2022. Following negotiations with The FA, the PFA achieved three significant policy changes relating to maternity provision, injury and illness and the termination of contracts due to long term injury. The changes will apply to players in the Women's Super League (WSL) and the Women's Championship.

Career statistics

References

External links 
 
 
 Grays Athletic profile

1982 births
Living people
Swiss people of Democratic Republic of the Congo descent
Swiss men's footballers
Democratic Republic of the Congo international footballers
Democratic Republic of the Congo footballers
Brighton & Hove Albion F.C. players
Atlético Madrid footballers
UB Conquense footballers
Lincoln City F.C. players
Grays Athletic F.C. players
Wrexham A.F.C. players
SV Wacker Burghausen players
Expatriate footballers in Germany
English Football League players
National League (English football) players
Charles III University of Madrid alumni
Association football forwards
Swiss expatriate footballers
Expatriate footballers in England